Psocidae is a family of barklice in the order Psocodea (formerly Psocoptera).

Members of this family are recognized by their wing-venation, where the areola postica is fused to the M-vein, giving rise to the so-called discoidal cell. This family is closely related to Myopsocidae. The family is widespread, including New Zealand.

Genera
These 86 genera belong to the family Psocidae:

 Amphigerontia Kolbe, 1880 i c g b
 Anomaloblaste c g
 Arabopsocus c g
 Atlantopsocus c g
 Atrichadenotecnum c g
 Atropsocus Mockford, 1993 i c g b
 Barrowia c g
 Blaste Kolbe, 1883 i c g b
 Blastopsocidus c g
 Blastopsocus Roesler, 1943 i c g b
 Brachinodiscus c g
 Camelopsocus Mockford, 1965 i c g b
 Cephalopsocus c g
 Cerastipsocus Kolbe, 1884 i c g b
 Ceratostigma c g
 Cervopsocus c g
 Chaetoblaste c g
 Chaetopsocidus c g
 Chilopsocus c g
 Clematoscenea c g
 Clematostigma c g
 Copostigma c g
 Cycetes c g
 Cyclotus Swainson, 1840 i c g
 Dactylopsocus c g
 Dictyopsocus c g
 Diplacanthoda c g
 Disopsocus c g
 Elaphopsocoides c g
 Elaphopsocus c g
 Elytropsocus c g
 Epiblaste c g
 Eremopsocus c g
 Euclismioides c g
 Fashenglianus c g
 Ghesquierella c g
 Gigantopsocus c g
 Glossoblaste c g
 Hyalopsocus Roesler, 1954 i c g b
 Hybopsocus c g
 Indiopsocus Mockford, 1974 i c g b
 Indoblaste c g
 Javablaste c g
 Javapsocus c g
 Kaindipsocus c g
 Kimunpsocus c g
 Lacroixiella c g
 Lasiopsocus c g
 Lativalva c g
 Lipsocus c g
 Loensia Enderlein, 1924 i c g b
 Longivalvus c g
 Lubricus c g
 Mecampsis c g
 Metylophorus Pearman, 1932 i c g b
 Neoblaste c g
 Neopsocopsis c g
 Neopsocus c g
 Ophthalmopsocus c g
 Oreopsocus c g
 Pearmania c g
 Pilipsocus c g
 Poecilopsocus c g
 Pogonopsocus c g
 Propsococerastis c g
 Pseudoclematus c g
 Pseudoptycta c g
 Psocidus c g
 Psococerastis c g
 Psocomesites c g
 Psocus Latreille, 1794 i c g b
 Ptycta Enderlein, 1925 i c g b
 Sacopsocus c g
 Sciadionopsocus c g
 Setopsocus c g
 Sigmatoneura c g
 Steleops Enderlein, 1910 i c g b
 Stylatopsocus c g
 Sundapsocus c g
 Symbiopsocus c g
 Tanystigma c g
 Thyrsophorus c g
 Thyrsopsocopsis c g
 Thyrsopsocus c g
 Trichadenopsocus c g
 Trichadenotecnum Enderlein, 1909 i c g b

Data sources: i = ITIS, c = Catalogue of Life, g = GBIF, b = Bugguide.net

References

 Lienhard, C. & Smithers, C. N. 2002. Psocoptera (Insecta): World Catalogue and Bibliography. Instrumenta Biodiversitatis, vol. 5. Muséum d'histoire naturelle, Genève.

 
Psocoptera families